Patriarch Atanasije may refer to:

 Atanasije I, Archbishop of Peć and Serbian Patriarch, head of the Serbian Orthodox Church, from 1711 until 1712
 Atanasije II Gavrilović,  Archbishop of Peć and Serbian Patriarch from 1747 to 1752